Teresa García Sena (Valencia, Spain, 26 March 1977) is a Spanish politician who belongs to the main opposition People's Party (PP).

Single, García holds a degree in law and served as legal advisor to the cabinet of the Valencian Regional Administration. For the 2008 election, she was placed tenth on the PP list for the Spanish Congress of Deputies for Valencia region where the PP had won eight seats at the previous election. Although the PP gained a seat, García initially failed to be elected. However, as first substitute, she entered Congress on 14 October 2008   replacing María José Catalá.

References

1977 births
Living people
People from Valencia
Politicians from the Valencian Community
Members of the 9th Congress of Deputies (Spain)
People's Party (Spain) politicians
21st-century Spanish women politicians